The Holman ministry (19131916), first Holman ministry or Holman Labor ministry was the 35th ministry of the New South Wales Government, and was led by the 19th Premier, William Holman.

Holman was elected to the New South Wales Legislative Assembly in 1898, serving until 1920, before being elected to the Australian House of Representatives. Holman, as Deputy Leader, had been acting premier from 15 March to 4 September 1911 while Premier James McGowen was overseas. Holman had been absent from the State from 27 December 1912 until 6 June 1913. When Holman returned, McGowen resigned due to his health and misjudgment in attempting to settle a gasworkers strike. Holman was elected leader of the Labor Party and was commissioned to form government by Sir Gerald Strickland, Governor of New South Wales.

At the Easter 1916 NSW Labor Conference, the Holman government was censured "for refusing to endeavour to carry out and give effect to the first plank of the Labour platform - abolition of the Upper
House". Holman resigned the Labor leadership but not the premiership or his seat. John Storey was elected leader, however on the same day a motion of confidence in the Holman government was passed and Holman restored as leader.

The ministry covers the period from 30 June 1913 until 15 November 1916. In November 1916 Labor split over conscription, when Premier Holman, and twenty of his supporters, including ministers William Ashford, William Grahame, David Hall, Henry Hoyle and Arthur Griffith were expelled from the party for defying party policy and supporting conscription. Holman and his supporters joined a grand coalition with the members of the various conservative parties. By 1917, this had coalesced into the Nationalist Party of Australia.

Composition of ministry

The composition of the ministry was announced by Premier Holman on 30 June 1913.

Ministers were members of the Legislative Assembly unless otherwise noted.

See also

Holman Nationalist ministry

Notes

References

 

New South Wales ministries
1913 establishments in Australia
1916 disestablishments in Australia
Australian Labor Party ministries in New South Wales